Daiva Ragažinskienė (née Tušlaitė; born 18 June 1986) is a Lithuanian racing cyclist, who currently rides for Lithuanian amateur team Colibri Cycling. She competed in the 2013 UCI women's road race in Florence.

Major results

2004
 2nd Road race, National Road Championships
 3rd  Individual pursuit, UEC European Junior Track Championships
 6th Road race, UCI Junior Road World Championships
2005
 3rd Time trial, National Road Championships
 3rd Overall Tour Cycliste Féminin International de l'Ardèche
2006
 National Road Championships
2nd Time trial
7th Road race
 5th Sparkassen Giro
 10th Overall Trophée d'Or Féminin
2007
 National Road Championships
2nd Time trial
7th Road race
 2nd Boucle des Championnes
 2nd Criterium des Championnes
 2nd Trophée des Cyclistines
 7th Trofeo Alfredo Binda-Comune di Cittiglio
 9th Time trial, UEC European Under-23 Road Championships
2008
 1st  Time trial, National Road Championships
 1st Young rider classification La Route de France
 6th Overall Tour de Pologne Feminin
1st Stage 4 (ITT)
 7th Time trial, UEC European Under-23 Road Championships
2009
 2nd Lyon Montplaisir
 7th Lyon Vaise
 10th Road race, National Road Championships
2013
 5th Road race, National Road Championships
2014
 1st Slezanski Mnich - Sobótka
 National Road Championships
2nd Time trial
4th Road race
 2nd Omnium, Athens Track Grand Prix
 3rd Dobromierz Kryterium
2015
 National Road Championships
1st  Road race
3rd Time trial
 1st Trofeo Avis Suvereto
 1st Points classification Trophée d'Or Féminin
 1st  Sprints classification Emakumeen Euskal Bira
 Panevezys
2nd Points race
3rd Individual pursuit
 4th Overall Giro della Toscana Int. Femminile – Memorial Michela Fanini
2016
 National Road Championships
1st  Road race
2nd Time trial
 3rd Overall Trophée d'Or Féminin
1st Mountains classification
 3rd Gran Premio Hotel Fiera Bolzano
 4th Grand Prix de Plumelec-Morbihan
 6th Trofee Maarten Wynants
 6th SwissEver GP Cham-Hagendorn
 10th Gooik–Geraardsbergen–Gooik
2017
 1st  Road race, National Road Championships
 1st  Sprints classification Ladies Tour of Norway
2018
 National Road Championships
1st  Time trial
3rd Road race
 9th Veenendaal–Veenendaal Classic

References

External links

1986 births
Living people
Lithuanian female cyclists
Sportspeople from Panevėžys
Cyclists at the 2015 European Games
European Games competitors for Lithuania
Cyclists at the 2016 Summer Olympics
Olympic cyclists of Lithuania